Series 60 may refer to:

Transport
 Oldsmobile Series 60, automobile series
 Cadillac Series 60, automobile series
 Buick Series 60, automobile series
 Nissan Patrol 60 Series, automobile series
 Detroit Diesel Series 60, line of diesel engines

Computing
 Series 60 platform, software platform for Symbian smartphones
 Series 60 browser, browser for Series 60 platform